Buildroot is a set of Makefiles and patches that simplifies and automates the process of building a complete and bootable Linux environment for an embedded system, while using cross-compilation to allow building for multiple target platforms on a single Linux-based development system.  Buildroot can automatically build the required cross-compilation toolchain, create a root file system, compile a Linux kernel image, and generate a boot loader for the targeted embedded system, or it can perform any independent combination of these steps.  For example, an already installed cross-compilation toolchain can be used independently, while Buildroot only creates the root file system.

Buildroot is primarily intended to be used with small or embedded systems based on various computer architectures and instruction set architectures (ISAs), including x86, ARM, MIPS and PowerPC.  Numerous architectures and their variants are supported; Buildroot also comes with default configurations for several off-the-shelf available embedded boards, such as Cubieboard, Raspberry Pi and SheevaPlug.  Several third-party projects and products use Buildroot as the basis for their build systems, including the OpenWrt project that creates an embedded operating system, and firmware for the customer-premises equipment (CPE) used by the Google Fiber broadband service.

Multiple C standard libraries are supported as part of the toolchain, including the GNU C Library, uClibc and musl, as well as the C standard libraries that belong to various preconfigured development environments, such as those provided by Linaro.  Buildroot's build configuration system internally uses Kconfig, which provides features such as a menu-driven interface, handling of dependencies, and contextual help; Kconfig is also used by the Linux kernel for its source-level configuration.  Buildroot is organized around numerous automatically downloaded packages, which contain the source code of various userspace applications, system utilities, and libraries.  Root file system images, which are the final results, may be built using various file systems, including cramfs, JFFS2, romfs, SquashFS and UBIFS.

Buildroot is free and open-source software, maintained by Peter Korsgaard and licensed under version 2 or later of the GNU General Public License (GPL).  The project started in 2001, with initial intentions to serve as a testbed for uClibc.  New releases are made available every three months.

See also 

 BitBake a make-like build tool focusing on cross-compiled packages and embedded Linux distributions
 BusyBox a software project that provides several stripped-down Unix tools in a single executable file
 Linux distribution an operating system made as a collection of software based on the Linux kernel and, often, a package management system
 OpenEmbedded a software framework for creating Linux distributions tailored for embedded devices
 uClibc a small C standard library intended for Linux-based embedded systems
 Yocto Project a Linux Foundation workgroup focusing on architecture-independent embedded Linux distributions
 OpenWrt an open source project for building Linux for embedded network devices based on Buildroot

References

External links 
 
 Buildroot: What's new?, Embedded Linux Conference 2014, by Thomas Petazzoni
 Buildroot: A deep dive into the core, Embedded Linux Conference Europe 2014, by Thomas Petazzoni
 Deciding between Buildroot and Yocto, LWN.net, April 6, 2016, by Nathan Willis

Build automation
Embedded Linux
Free computer programming tools